Andrzej Grabarczyk may refer to:

Andrzej Grabarczyk (actor) (born 1953), Polish actor
Andrzej Grabarczyk (athlete) (1964–2016), Polish athlete